Alexander MacFarlane  ( – 23 August 1755) was a Scottish polymath who was active as an astronomer, merchant, mathematician, judge, politician and planter. Born in Scotland, MacFarlane graduated from the University of Glasgow in 1728 and immigrated to the British colony of Jamaica, where he settled down to a career as a merchant and acquired several sugar plantations operated with slave labour. 

In addition to working as a judge and politician, MacFarlane also pursued an amateur career in astronomy in Port Royal and Kingston, using equipment purchased from fellow astronomer Colin Campbell. After his death in 1755, MacFarlane bequethed his plantations to his brothers and his astronomical equipment to the University of Glasgow, which used it to establish an observatory, naming it Macfarlane Observatory in his honour.

Early life

Alexander MacFarlane was born in Scotland . His parents were John MacFarlane, who died in 1705, and Lady Helen Arbuthnot, the daughter of Robert Arbuthnot, 2nd Viscount of Arbuthnott; the Arbuthnot family's motto was Astra castra, Numen lumen (the stars my camp, the Lord my light). The youngest of four sons, MacFarlane entered the University of Glasgow, graduating from the university with a Master of Arts in 1728. After he graduated, MacFarlane immigrated to the British colony of Jamaica.

Career in Jamaica and death

After arriving in Jamaica, MacFarlane settled down to a career as a merchant and gradually acquired several landholdings in the colony. In November 1735, having established himself as a prosperous trader and assistant judge who owned several sugar plantations, he was appointed as the first Postmaster General of Jamaica. MacFarlane also entered into a career in politics, being elected to the House of Assembly of Jamaica in 1754 representing Saint Elizabeth Parish. In 1747, he purchased the "Biscany" plantation in Saint Elizabeth Parish from Benjamin Allan.

In addition to his professional career, MacFarlane also developed an interest in astronomy and mathematics as well. At a house he acquired in Port Royal, MacFarlane ordered the construction of an observatory, purchasing astronomy equipment from Colin Campbell, a fellow planter and astronomer who was an acquaintance of Sir Edmond Halley. Campbell, a fellow of the Royal Society, had constructed an astronomy in Jamaica in 1731 to observe and catalogue the southern celestial hemisphere. 

MacFarlane subsequently constructed an observatory at Kingston, Jamaica, having purchased all of Campbell's astronomy equipment by 1743 for the purpose of establishing an independent observatory. This observatory included a 4-foot mural arch, a 5-foot transit telescope, a 1-month regulator clock and a 5-foot zenith sector. However, MacFarlane found the zenith sector difficult to use, and so designed a new horizontal reflecting sector and in 1755 contracted Swiss instrument maker Pierre Martel, who regularly took care of MacFarlane's equipment, to build it for him.

In November 1743, MacFarlane wrote a letter to Scottish telescope designer James Short, reporting on astronomical observations he had made in Jamaica. After receiving the letter, Short went to London and read it to his fellow members of the Royal Society and moved to nominate him as a fellow of the Royal Society. Though as noted by historian David Clarke, MacFarlane's astronomical work was "fairly minimal in modern terms", he was made a fellow by the Royal Society on 20 November 1746. MacFarlane continued to send reports of his observations to the Royal Society until his death on 23 August 1755. At the time of his death, he owned 791 slaves spread across six sugar plantations.

Legacy

After his death, MacFarlane's astronomy in Kingston was converted by the colonial authorities into the Surrey County jail. As he died unmarried, MacFarlane left the majority of his estate in his will to his two brothers, Walter and William; this included the "Serge Island", "Biscany", "Bog Pen", "Glen Goff", "Lennox Castle" and "Windsor" plantations. His will also stipulated that all of his astronomical instruments would be donated to the University of Glasgow. The equipment was transported from Jamaica to Scotland onboard the merchant ship Casar, and was damaged during the voyage due to exposure to the ocean air. After receiving them on 29 October 1756, the university contracted James Watt to repair them. In the next year, the university established an observatory using MacFarlane's instruments, naming it Macfarlane Observatory in his honour.

In the 21st century, MacFarlane's ownership of slaves has come under greater scrutiny. The University of Glasgow published a report titled "Slavery, Abolition and The University of Glasgow" in 2018 as part of its efforts towards a "programme of reparatory justice". In the report, which detailed the university's relationship with slavery and abolitionism, the university noted that MacFarlane's slave ownership led to him acquiring a large fortune. It also noted that despite the fact that his donation of the instruments proved vital to the foundation of the observatory in 1757, MacFarlane did  not provide any monetary support in his will to the university.

References

Footnotes

Bibliography

 
 
 
 
 
 
 
 
 

1702 births
1755 deaths
18th-century Jamaican judges
18th-century Scottish businesspeople
18th-century Scottish judges
18th-century Scottish landowners
18th-century Scottish politicians
18th-century Scottish scientists
Alumni of the University of Glasgow
British planters
Fellows of the Royal Society
Jamaican astronomers
Jamaican businesspeople
Jamaican people of Scottish descent
Scottish astronomers
Scottish mathematicians
Scottish slave owners